Eric Pierpoint (born November 18, 1950) is an American actor and author.  He is perhaps best known for his role as George Francisco on Fox Network's Alien Nation.  He has also notably appeared on each of the first four Star Trek television spin-offs.

Early life
Pierpoint is the son of Patricia Adams Pierpoint and stepson of former CBS news White House correspondent Robert Pierpoint. He was born in Redlands, California, the middle of three children and lived there until age nine. His mother relocated to Washington, DC in 1959 upon marrying the elder Pierpoint, who legally adopted all three children.  He graduated from Walt Whitman High School in Bethesda, Maryland and was on the wrestling, soccer, and tennis teams. He spent time accompanying his stepfather on news assignments during his teen years, often meeting high ranking US Government officials. He then attended the University of Redlands in Redlands, California, majoring in philosophy and receiving his Bachelor's Degree. He was captain of the soccer team, and took his first drama course as a senior and began his pursuit of acting after graduation.  He then attended The Catholic University of America in Washington, D.C., where he received his Master's Degree in Fine Arts.

Career

Acting
Pierpoint's onscreen career began in 1984, landing his first role in the film Windy City. Later that same year, he was cast in his first lead role in the short-lived television series Hot Pursuit, which was produced by Kenneth Johnson. He continued to appear in guest roles on TV series during the 1980s, including winning a recurring role on the sixth season of the popular show Fame.  In 1989, he was again cast by Kenneth Johnson in another TV series, the television adaption of the 1988 film Alien Nation. Pierpoint would take over the role of Detective Samuel "George" Francisco, originated by Mandy Patinkin in the film, starring opposite Gary Graham as Detective Matthew Sikes. The series, though very popular among fans, was canceled after one season. Pierpoint went on to play the character in five subsequent Alien Nation TV movies from 1993 to 1997.  Between 1993 and 2005, he starred in five separate guest roles on all four Star Trek series spin offs. He also continues to work regularly outside of science fiction, garnering many roles in popular films and TV shows during his career, including the 1997 film Liar, Liar and the more recent TV series Hart of Dixie and Parks and Recreation.

In addition to numerous roles on television and film, Pierpoint has been active in theater, starring in many plays throughout his career. His most recent role was in The Lion In Winter for the Ensemble Theater Company.

Writing
In 2013, he completed his first book, a Young Adult Historical Fiction novel titled The Last Ride of Caleb O'Toole, which was published on September 3, 2013. His second novel, also historical fiction, is currently being written.

In addition to reading his work to middle school children in an educational book tour, he also teaches guest master classes in acting at various universities.

Personal life
Pierpoint has been active in the Big Brothers of Greater Los Angeles for a number of years.  He currently resides in Topanga, California.

Film

Television

References

External links

 Official website
 
 

1950 births
Living people
Male actors from Los Angeles
American male film actors
American male television actors
Catholic University of America alumni
College men's soccer players in the United States
Soccer players from Los Angeles
University of Redlands alumni
American male writers
Association footballers not categorized by position
Association football players not categorized by nationality
Walt Whitman High School (Maryland) alumni